Střelecký Island (Czech: Střelecký ostrov meaning Archer's Island) is an island in the Vltava in Prague, Czech Republic.

External links

 

River islands of the Czech Republic
Vltava